Baridhara is an upscale residential area in Dhaka, Bangladesh. It is located on the east of and north east of Gulshan across Gulshan-Baridhara Lake. It has special zones designated for diplomats, and many of the city's foreign embassies and high commissions are situated here. There are mainly three areas diplomatic zone mainly in the south-west portion, general residential area in eastern portion and an adjacent DOHS area in north-east portion.

Economy
US-Bangla Airlines has its headquarters in the Baridhara Diplomatic Zone.

Education
The Japanese School Dhaka, the French International School of Dhaka and the American International School of Dhaka are located in Baridhara.

Notable residents
 Jamal Uddin Ahmad, Deputy Prime Minister of Bangladesh 1977–1982
 Hussain Muhammad Ershad, former president of Bangladesh and military dictator
 Shabnam, Bangladeshi actress
 Shahnaz Rahmatullah, Bangladeshi singer

Embassies

References

Neighbourhoods in Dhaka